Siraj al-Din 'Ali b. 'Uthman al-Ushi al-Farghani was a Hanafi jurist, Maturidi theologian, hadith expert (muhaddith), Chief Judge or Supreme Judge (Qadi al-Qudah or 'Aqda al-Qudah as he was also called), and researcher who has ferreted out facts and established them (muhaqqiq). He is probably best known for his work on a confession of faith in rhyme entitled al-Qasida al-Lamiyya fi al-Tawhid, also called Bad' al-Amali or from the opening words Qasidat Yaqulu al-'Abd.

Birth 
He was born or lived in Osh (Ush), by the Ferghana Valley (Ush in today's Kyrgyzstan) and hence his demonym al-Ushi.

Books 
His well known writings include:
 Al-Fatawa al-Sirajiyyah.
 Bad' al-Amali.
 Ghurar al-Akhbar wa Durar al-Ash'ar, abstract Nisab al-Akhbar li-Tadhkirat al-Akhyar, 1000 short traditions in 100 chapters.

Death 
He died at the end of the 6th /12th century, after 569 AH (1173/4 AD), specifically in 575/1179–80.

See also

References

External links
 A Brief Biography of Siraj al-Din al-Ushi 

Hanafis
Maturidis
12th-century Muslim theologians
Hadith scholars
Chief justices
Sunni imams
Sunni fiqh scholars
Sunni Muslim scholars of Islam
People from Osh
Kyrgyzstani Sunni Muslims
Uzbekistani Sunni Muslims
1179 deaths
1180 deaths